CVRCE may also refer to:

C.V.Raman College of Engineering,(CVRCE), Bhubaneshwar, Orissa, India.
Cvrče